Trypanosoma rangeli is a species of hemoflagellate excavate parasites of the genus Trypanosoma. Although infecting a variety of mammalian species in a wide geographical area in Central and South America, this parasite is considered non-pathogenic to these hosts. T. rangeli is transmitted by bite of infected triatomine bugs of the Reduviidae family, commonly known as barbeiro, winchuka (vinchuca), chinche, pito ou chupão.

The genome was published in September 2014.

Occurring in sympatry with Trypanosoma cruzi , the etiological agent of Chagas disease, in wide geographical areas in the Americas, T. rangeli shares hosts, vectors and a large amount of its antigenic coat T. cruzi leading to misdiagnosis of Chagas disease.

References

Bibliography

Parasites of mammals
Trypanosomatida
Species described in 1920